The 2008–09 FC Bayern Munich II season is the first season they participated in the 3. Liga.

Review

July–September
On 27 July, Bayern Munich II opened up their season with a 2–1 victory against Union Berlin. Thomas Müller and Mehmet Ekici scored for Bayern II and Shergo Biran scored for Union Berlin. Bayern II finished the matchday tied for fifth with VfR Aalen. On matchday two, on 2 August, Bayern II and Borussia Wuppertal finished in a 2–2 draw. Deniz Yılmaz and Mehmet Ekici scored for Bayern II and Marcel Reichwein and Tobias Damm scored for Borussia Wuppertal. Bayern II finished the matchday in seventh place. On matchday three, on 16 August, Bayern II defeated Dynamo Dresden 1–0 with a goal from Daniel Sikorski. Bayern II finished the matchday in third place. On matchday four, on 23 August, Bayern II defeated Eintracht Braunschweig 1–0 with a goal from Mehmet Ekici. Bayern II finished the matchday in first place. On matchday five, on 29 August, Bayern II defeated Carl Zeiss Jena 2–1. Deniz Yılmaz and Thomas Müller scored for Bayern II and Salvatore Amirante scored for Carl Zeiss Jena. Bayern II finished the matchday in second place. The match between Bayern II and VfR Aalen on matchday six, on 13 September, finished in a goalless draw. Bayern II finished the matchday in second place. Bayern II had their second consecutive draw after a 1–1 draw against Werder Bremen II on matchday seven, on 19 September. Bayern II finished the matchday in third place. Bayern II loss of their first match of the season after losing to SC Paderborn 07 2–1 on matchday eight, on 27 September. Frank Löning scored two goals for Paderborn and Daniel Sikorski scored for Bayern II. Bayern II finished the matchday in seventh place.

October–December
Bayern II drew all four of their matches in October. The first match, on matchday nine, on 5 October, against Stuttgarter Kickers, finished in a 3–3 draw. Bayern II got two goals from Deniz Yılmaz and a goal from Toni Kroos and Stuttgarter Kickers got a goal each from Michael Schürg, Benedikt Deigendesch, and Angelo Vaccaro. Bayern II finished the matchday in seventh place. The second match, against Fortuna Düsseldorf, on matchday 10, on 18 October, finished in a 1–1 draw. Thomas Müller scored for Bayern II and Ranisav Jovanović scored for Fortuna Düsseldorf. Bayern II finished the matchday in sixth place. In the third match against SpVgg Unterhaching, on matchday 11, on 26 October, finished in a goalless draw. Bayern II finished the matchday in seventh place. In the final match in October, on matchday 12, on 29 October, Bayern and SV Sandhausen finished in a 3–3 draw. Bayern II got two goals from Thomas Müller and a goal from Daniel Sikorski. Alf Mintzel, Sreto Ristić, and Roberto Pinto scored for Sandhausen. Bayern II player Oliver Stierle was sent–off. Bayern II finished the matchday in seventh place. Bayern II started November with a 2–2 draw against Jahn Regensburg on 2 November. Bayern II got goals from Thomas Müller and Daniel Sikorski. Jahn Regensburg got goals from Nico Beigang and Andreas Schäffer. Bayern II finished the matchday in eighth place.

Results

Final league table

Results summary

League results

Squad and statistics

References

FC Bayern Munich II seasons
Bayern Munich II